Christina Zurbrügg (born 27 March 1961 in Reichenbach im Kandertal, Switzerland), is a Swiss singer, modern yodeler Film director that is living in Vienna now. In 2021 she was selected by BJ Sam the Nigerian international singer and producer to represent Switzerland in the first universal Christmas music project with other global music icons including Hollywood Actor  Paul Raci, Bollywood payback singer  Jaspinder Narula,  Ghanaian Legendary singer  Diana Hopeson,

Life and work
Christina Zurbrügg grew up in the Bernese Oberland. She studied acting and classical singing in Vienna. She became known for their musical theater productions about Federico García Lorca. Zurbrügg deals with folk music, filmed the documentary "On Orvuse Oanwe" about Vienna's recent doodlers and found their own roots. Later, the solo program followed "Christls Wonder World". Your Song Album "now" was reviewed as "first class, pop musical work between tradition and modernity." Zurbrügg combines singing, rap and contemporary, modern yodeling with songwriting. In 2001 she founded with Michael Hudecek, with whom she made many projects together, the Gams Film & Music.

Discography
 1990: Café de Chinitas. Spanish Folk Songs of F.G. Lorca; A tubs full of children, to snotty man. Folk Songs from the woman's life
 1991: Scared. songs
 1992: Sunset with Café de Chinitas
 1995: Ciudad sin sueño – No one sleeps in the sky. Settings of F.G. Lorca
 1999: Äs chönnti alls completely different sii. New yodelling and songs
 2002: Tai Chill by zurbrügg & hudecek. soundtrack; Christl's Wonder World
 2005: Lorca & More. Best of Spanish 1990 – 2005
 2007: Now. Twelve Songs & a yodel
 2009: Best of yodel. 99-09
 2010: change of register

Filmography
 1998: Orvuse on Oanwe – The last doodlers Vienna. Director: Zurbrügg
 2000: The 99 best inventions of mankind. Director: Zurbrügg and Hudecek
 2001: In Out – Move the World. With Birgit Heyn. Director: Zurbrügg
 2006: Stay or Go. Director: Zurbrügg & Hudecek
 2008: Half-time. Director: Zurbrügg & Hudecek

Awards
 2009: Nominated for the "Rose d'Or" for the movie "half" of Zurbrügg & Hudecek
 2007: "Golden Dragon" for the movie "Stay or Go" by Zurbrügg and Hudecek
 2002: BKA premium for "Christl's Wonderful World"
 1990: BMUK or 1995: Cultural Office Vienna: the awards for "Café de Chinitas"

Writings
 Orvuse on Oanwe – doodlers in Vienna, Vienna 1996
 Negress, The apple, Vienna 1994.

References

External links
 Christina Zurbrüggs Website
 Archive of Austrian popular music
 Stadtspionin – Interview
 Article mica
 GAMS Movie and Music on Zurbrügg and Hudecek
 The press / TVPreis Rose d'Or 2009

21st-century Swiss women singers
Austrian singer-songwriters
1961 births
Swiss singer-songwriters
Living people